Vasanthiyum Lakshmiyum Pinne Njaanum is a 1999 Indian Malayalam-language drama film directed by Vinayan based on a screenplay by J. Pallassery. The film features Kalabhavan Mani, Kaveri, Praveena and Sai Kumar in the lead roles. The film centers around Ramu, a blind poet and singer who supports his family. However, their happiness dissipates soon after he gets cheated by a rich businessman. The film is reported to be inspired from Dosti (1964).

The film was a commercial success and ran for more than 150 days in theatres. The film won two National Film Awards, the Best Male Playback Singer for M. G. Sreekumar and the Special Jury Award for Kalabhavan Mani and Mani also received the Special Jury Award at the Kerala State Film Awards for his performance in the film. The film also won two Asianet Film Awards: Best Actor for Kalabhavan Mani and Best Supporting Actress for Praveena. The film was remade to Tamil as Kasi, in Telugu as Seenu Vasanthi Lakshmi and in Kannada as Namma Preethiya Ramu.

Plot
Vasanthiyum Lakshmiyum Pinne Njaanum is a tale about the deception of appearances. Ramu is a blind poet and singer who supports his family by his songs. He has an older brother Meghanadhan, who is a drunkard; an abusive, crippled father; and a younger sister Vasanthi. When the local landlord Thomas Chacko returns to the district, he brings along with him Dinesh, the CM's son and his wife Radhika. Thomas Chacko has a reputation as a God in the area because of his charitable works, and when a specialist eye doctor arrives, he promises to pay the fees for an operation to give back Ramu's vision. Elated by this news, Ramu learns that he has to find an eye donor. His lover Lakshmi, who cannot speak, offers one of her eyes. Unfortunately, something happens that shows that the 'God-like' Thomas Chacko is not what he seems to be. Blissfully unaware of the sadness of those around him, Ramu looks forward to his operation. One morning, on the day of her wedding, Vasanthi was found dead and it is figured out that she commits suicide because of Thomas and when Thomas comes to attend the funeral, Ramu explains to Thomas of what he did as he kills Thomas by choking him.

Cast

Soundtrack 

The soundtrack consists of a total of 10 songs. The film score and all the songs were composed by Mohan Sithara, with lyrics from Yusef Ali Kecheri. It was released on 20 May 1999 as an album on the Sargam Speed Audios label. The song Aalilakkanna Ninte Muralika is picturized on Kalabhavan Mani. The song Aalilakkanna Ninte Muralika is set in the Sindhu Bhairavi raga, while the song Kannuneerinum Chirikkanariyam is set in the Yamunakalyani raga. M. G. Sreekumar got the National Film Award for Best Male Playback Singer the second time for the song Chanthupottum Chankelassum for a heartwarming rendition of the song. All the film's songs were chartbusters and stayed in the charts for several months following its release. The film is known for revitalizing the folk music genre in Malayalam cinema. The rights of the cassette were sold for  ₹30 lakhs.

Track listing

Reception

Critical reception 
The film received mostly positive reviews from critics. Noted director Hariharan, after watching the film in a theatre in Kozhikode called Vinayan and appreciated him for his work in the film. The Times of India praised Kalabhavan Mani's performance writing:" Ramu from Vasanthiyum Lakshmiyum Pinne Njanum is undeniably one of the most challenging roles in Kalabhavan Mani’s acting career. We have seen many actors playing the role of visually challenged individuals on screen, but Kalabhavan Mani’s character Ramu stands out. Be it the way he controlled his eye movements or his acting chops especially in the intense emotional scenes, Kalabhavan Mani made the audience fall for him. The actor managed to ace the role with sheer determination and perfection." Kalabhavan Mani also won the Special Jury Award at the National Film Awards for a sensitive and realistic portrayal of a blind man complete with his behavioral and gestural distortions as he copes with difficulties in making life meaningful. Sify writes, praising Vinayan's direction: "Vinayan began with a theme that has been common in the Malayalam films of 60's and an unbelievable story line. But he could present it in a touching way that even the most iron-hearted could not help burst into tears. The full credit goes to Vinayan from preventing the story turning into a melodrama."

Box office 
Expectations for Vasanthiyum Lakshmiyum Pinne Njaanum was low. The film opened to near-empty halls and by the end of the first week, all theaters were houseful for every show. It had an extraordinary run, running for more than 100 days in many centers. The film was a commercial success. The film was made on a budget of 45 lakhs and grossed around 3 crores at the box office.

Awards

National Film Awards 
 National Film Award for Best Male Playback Singer - M. G. Sreekumar
 National Film Award – Special Jury Award - Kalabhavan Mani

Kerala State Film Awards 
 Kerala State Film Award – Special Jury Award - Kalabhavan Mani

Asianet Film Awards 
 Asianet Film Award for Best Actor - Kalabhavan Mani
 Asianet Film Award for Best Supporting Actress - Praveena

Remakes 
Vasanthiyum Lakshmiyum Pinne Njaanum was remade in Tamil as Kasi (2001), Kannada as Namma Preethiya Ramu (2003), Telugu as Seenu Vasanthi Lakshmi (2004), and Sinhala as Sooriyaa (2012).

References

External links 
 

1999 films
1990s Malayalam-language films
Malayalam films remade in other languages
Films about blind people in India
Films scored by Mohan Sithara
Indian drama films
Films about disability in India
Films directed by Vinayan